The Elephant Man is a 1982 American biographical television film directed by Jack Hofsiss about the 19th-century English medical curiosity Joseph Merrick (known in this film as John Merrick). The script was adapted by Steve Lawson from the 1977 play of the same name by Bernard Pomerance. It was first broadcast by the American Broadcasting Company (ABC) on January 4, 1982.

Playwright Pomerance's Broadway debut of The Elephant Man in 1977 was directed by Hofsiss, who became the youngest ever winner of a Tony Award for directing the play. In the film, Philip Anglim and Kevin Conway reprised their roles from the play as John Merrick and Frederick Treves, respectively.

The film received four Emmy Award nominations; Penny Fuller won the award for 'Outstanding Supporting Actress in a Limited Series or a Special'. At the 40th Golden Globe Awards, Philip Anglim was nominated for the Golden Globe Award for Best Actor – Miniseries or Television Film. Jack Hofsiss was nominated for a Directors Guild of America Award for 'Outstanding Directorial Achievement in Dramatic Specials'.

Cast
Philip Anglim as John Merrick
Kevin Conway as Frederick Treves
Penny Fuller as Mrs. Kendal
Glenn Close as Princess Alexandra

References

External links

1982 television films
1982 films
1982 drama films
American biographical drama films
American television films
American films based on plays
Films about sideshow performers
Cultural depictions of Joseph Merrick
1980s American films